Cameron Lake is at the end of the Akamina Parkway, Waterton Lakes National Park, Alberta, Canada. It is named after Donald Roderick Cameron (1834–1921) a British Royal Artillery captain.
The 49th parallel north runs through the southern end of the lake making part of it technically in Glacier County, Montana.

See also
Lakes in Alberta
List of lakes in Glacier County, Montana

References

Cameron Lake
Lakes of Glacier County, Montana
Lakes of Glacier National Park (U.S.)